Shakespeare by the Sea is a professional theatre company and registered society in Halifax, Nova Scotia.

History
Founded in 1994, Shakespeare by the Sea specialises in performing the works of William Shakespeare. Plays are performed outdoors in an amphitheatre formed by the ruins of the Cambridge Battery, an old military battery in Point Pleasant Park, and occasionally at other locations. The company is partially funded by government grants and private enterprise, with the main source of revenue coming from patrons' donations, which makes up about 70% of their revenues.

The company was formed by the late Patrick Christopher-Carter (1945–2005), his lifelong partner Elizabeth Murphy, and Jean Morpurgo. It has played every year in the park, performing three to four productions every summer.

In 1999, a "family" show was added to the repertoire using a theme from a classical fairy tale or legend. The tale is script is collectively created by the director and the cast, and usually includes a musical element created by a composer. From 1999 to 2004, the family show was known for its lack of traditional props, with only colourful Styrofoam pool noodles being used to create all props and set pieces.

In the summer of 2005, the company went away from the Pool Noodle concept and transformed the family show into a musical, directed by Jesse MacLean, with music written by actor Jeremy Hutton and lyrics by Hutton, MacLean, William Foley, Kevin MacPherson, and Kate Smith titled The Adventures of Robin Hood. The show, with new music and lyrics by Hutton and Kieren MacMillan, then received two workshop productions at the Toronto Youth Theatre in 2007 and 2008, both directed by Hutton. Shakespeare By The Sea brought the show back to Point Pleasant Park for production in the summer of 2011, garnering significant popular and critical success. In January, 2013, Toronto's Hart House Theatre presented a three-week run of the newest incarnation of the show, now entitled "Robin Hood: The Legendary Musical Comedy". This production played to many sold-out houses, and was a darling of both audiences and critics.

In 2005, the Canada Day performance was The Midnight Twelfth Night, which began at midnight and concluded with the marriage of founders Patrick Christopher-Carter and Elizabeth Murphy. Following the sudden passing of Christopher-Carter later that year, in 2006 Elizabeth Murphy and Jennie Raymond formed a co-artistic directorship to steer the company through a transitional year. In 2007, Elizabeth Murphy took over as Artistic Director.

In some years a one-off peripatetic performance is staged, using various local, historic sites and batteries as dramatic settings for the play. To date, the company has performed Hamlet at the Prince of Wales Martello Tower twice, Richard III at the Sir Sandford Fleming Tower and at the Halifax Citadel, Henry V at the Halifax Citadel, King Lear at the Halifax Citadel, Julius Caesar in the historic courthouse on Spring Garden Road and Measure for Measure at the Prince of Wales Martello Tower.

Murphy has led the drive to develop the rehearsal and office space that the company uses into The Park Place Theatre, an 82-seat black box venue, to be used in the event of poor weather during the summer. The theatre has allowed the company to expand its operations into the spring and fall with small scale productions happening on an annual basis. The venue has also become a valued rehearsal and performance space for other small theatre companies based in Nova Scotia from September to May each year.

In 2012, longtime Artistic Associate Jesse MacLean joined Elizabeth Murphy as a Co-Artistic Director. Since 2003, MacLean has directed over two dozen productions for the company.

2013 marked the 20th season of professional theatre presentation by Shakespeare By The Sea. The company played to 13,000 over 68 performances in Point Pleasant Park, making it one of the most successful seasons in recent years.

Productions
Information about past productions is from the Shakespeare by the Sea website's section for "Past Performances".

1994–1999

2000–2009

2010–

Notes and references

Notes

References

Sources

See also
 Culture of Halifax, Nova Scotia
 Shakespeare by the Sea (Australia)

External links
 

Theatre companies in Nova Scotia
Festivals in Halifax, Nova Scotia
Culture of Halifax, Nova Scotia
Shakespearean theatre companies
Tourist attractions in Halifax County, Nova Scotia
Shakespeare festivals in Canada
Theatre festivals in Nova Scotia